The 2011 Amstel Gold Race was the 46th running of the Amstel Gold Race, a single-day cycling race.

's Philippe Gilbert claimed victory for the second successive year after making a decisive move in the race's closing stages, attacking the field on the final climb of the race – the 12% gradient Cauberg – and thus becoming the first rider to win two Amstel Gold Races since Rolf Järmann won the race in 1993 and 1998. Gilbert also became only the second rider to win the race in consecutive years after Jan Raas' four consecutive victories between 1977 and 1980. 's Joaquim Rodríguez finished the race in second place, having been the last challenger to Gilbert on the Cauberg, with the podium completed by  rider Simon Gerrans.

Results

References

External links

Amstel Gold Race
2011 UCI World Tour
2011 in Dutch sport